Heinrich "Heini" Messner (born 1 September 1939) is a retired Austrian alpine skier. He competed at the 1964, 1968 and 1972 Olympics and won two bronze medals: in the giant slalom in 1968 and in the downhill in 1972.

Career
On 5 January 1967 Messner won the first ever World Cup race, a slalom; he had 15 more World Cup podium finishes later in his career. In the 1970s he pioneered the use of short skis in the technical races. Messner retired in 1972 season and for two years trained the Austrian women’s team. He then moved to Steinach am Brenner where he ran a ski school, a boarding house, and a ski rental service.

National titles
Messner has won five national championships at individual senior level.

Austria Alpine Ski Championships
Downhill_ 1961
Giant slalom: 1967
Slalom: 1964, 1965, 1967

References

External links
 
 

1939 births
Living people
Olympic alpine skiers of Austria
Austrian male alpine skiers
Olympic bronze medalists for Austria
Olympic medalists in alpine skiing
Medalists at the 1968 Winter Olympics
Medalists at the 1972 Winter Olympics
Alpine skiers at the 1964 Winter Olympics
Alpine skiers at the 1968 Winter Olympics
Alpine skiers at the 1972 Winter Olympics
20th-century Austrian people
21st-century Austrian people